Maysie Hoy is a Canadian film editor and actress.

Hoy has a brother, William Hoy, who is also a film editor.

Life 
Hoy grew up in Canada, and moved to San Francisco to study improvisational theatre. She took up the role of artistic director at a new improvisational company, The Good Will Store. She also taught theatre games in schools and correctional facilities, and acted in Robert Altman's 1971 film McCabe & Mrs. Miller.

Following filming, Hoy moved to Los Angeles and gained an apprenticeship to Altman. She worked in research, costume and production design, and acted in several of his films, including California Split, Nashville, 3 Women and A Wedding. She later became a film assistant, a sound assistant, and film editor. Her editing credits include Altman's 1992 film The Player, many films for director Tyler Perry and the Oscar-nominated film The Joy Luck Club. In 2006 she edited the acclaimed film, The Celestine Prophecy.

Hoy is on the Board of Directors of both the Motion Picture Editors Guild and American Cinema Editors.

References

1949 births
Living people
Canadian stage actresses
Canadian film editors
Canadian women film editors